Crypsis alopecuroides is a species of grass known by the common name foxtail pricklegrass. It is native to Europe, the Middle East, and North Africa. It is also known in the western United States as a common and widespread introduced species, especially in sandy areas around water, such as lakesides. It has also been collected at shipping points near Philadelphia but has not been seen there in about a century. This is an annual grass producing mostly upright and unbranching stems, often dark in color, up to about 75 centimeters in maximum height. The green leaves are up to 12 centimeters long, sometimes waxy in texture. The inflorescence is a dense cylindrical panicle of tiny green to purple spikelets.

References

External links
Jepson Manual Treatment
USDA Plants Profile
Photo gallery

Chloridoideae